The Asian black bear (Ursus thibetanus), also known as the Asiatic black bear, moon bear and white-chested bear, is a medium-sized bear species native to Asia that is largely adapted to an arboreal lifestyle. It lives in the Himalayas, southeastern Iran, the northern parts of the Indian subcontinent, the Korean Peninsula, China, the Russian Far East, the islands of Honshū and Shikoku in Japan, and Taiwan. It is listed as vulnerable on the IUCN Red List, and is threatened by deforestation and poaching for its body parts, which are used in traditional medicine.

Characteristics

The Asian black bear has black fur, a light brown muzzle, and a distinct whitish or creamy patch on the chest, which is sometimes V-shaped. Its ears are bell shaped, proportionately longer than those of other bears, and stick out sideways from the head.

Asian black bears are similar in general build to brown bears (Ursus arctos), but are lighter and more slender. The lips and nose are larger and more mobile than those of brown bears. The skulls of Asian black bears are relatively small, but massive, particularly in the lower jaw. Compared to other bears of the genus Ursus, the projections of the skull are weakly developed; the sagittal crest is low and short, even in old specimens, and does not exceed more than 19–20% of the total length of the skull, unlike in brown bears, which have sagittal crests comprising up to 41% of the skull's length.

Although mostly herbivorous, the jaw structure of Asian black bears is not as specialized for plant eating as that of giant pandas: Asian black bears have much narrower zygomatic arches, and the weight ratio of the two pterygoid muscles is also much smaller in Asian black bears. The lateral slips of the temporal muscles are thicker and stronger in Asian black bears.

An Asian black bear with broken hind legs can still climb effectively. In contrast to polar bears, Asian black bears have powerful upper bodies for climbing trees, and relatively weak hind legs which are shorter than those in brown bears and American black bears. They are the most bipedal of all bears, and have been known to walk upright for over a quarter of a mile. The heel pads on the forefeet are larger than those of most other bear species. Their claws, which are primarily used for climbing and digging, are slightly longer on the fore foot (30–45 mm) than the back (18–36 mm), and are larger and more hooked than those of the American black bear.

On average, adult Asian black bears are slightly smaller than American black bears, though large males can exceed the size of several other bear species.

The famed British sportsman known as the "Old Shekarry" wrote of how an Asian black bear he shot in India probably weighed no less than  based on how many people it took to lift its body. Although their senses are more acute than those of brown bears, their eyesight is poor, and their hearing range is moderate, the upper limit being 30 kHz.

Taxonomy

Ancestral and sister taxa
Biologically and morphologically, Asian black bears represent the beginning of the arboreal specializations attained by sloth bears and sun bears. Asian black bears have karyotypes nearly identical to those of the five other ursine bears, and, as is typical in the genus, they have 74 chromosomes. From an evolutionary perspective, Asian black bears are the least changed of the Old World bears, with certain scientists arguing that it is likely that all other lineages of ursine bear stem from this species. Scientists have proposed that Asian black bears are either a surviving, albeit modified, form of Ursus etruscus, specifically the early, small variety of the Middle Villafranchian (Upper Pliocene to Lower Pleistocene) or a larger form of Ursus minimus, an extinct species that arose 4,000,000 years ago. With the exception of the age of the bones, it is often difficult to distinguish the remains of Ursus minimus with those of modern Asian black bears.

Asian black bears are close relatives to American black bears, with which they share a European common ancestor; the two species are thought to have diverged 3,000,000 years ago, though genetic evidence is inconclusive. Both the American and Asian black species are considered sister taxa and are more closely related to each other than to the other species of bear. The earliest known specimens of Asian black bears are known from the Early Pliocene of Moldova.  The earliest American black bear fossils, which were located in Port Kennedy, Pennsylvania, greatly resemble the Asian black species. The first mtDNA study undertaken on Asian black bears suggested that the species arose after the American black bears, while a second study could not statistically resolve the branching order of sloth bears and the two black species, suggesting that these three species underwent a rapid radiation event. A third study suggested that American black bears and Asian black bears diverged as sister taxa after the sloth bear lineage and before the sun bear lineage. Further investigations on the entire mitochondrial cytochrome b sequence indicate that the divergence of continental Asian and Japanese black bear populations might have occurred when bears crossed the land bridge between the Korean peninsula and Japan 500,000 years ago, which is consistent with paleontological evidence.

Subspecies

Until the Late Pleistocene, two further subspecies ranged across Europe and West Asia. These are U. t. mediterraneus from Western Europe and the Caucasus and U. t. permjak from Eastern Europe, particularly the Ural Mountains.

Hybrids
Asian black bears are reproductively compatible with several other bear species, and have on occasion produced hybrid offspring. According to Jack Hanna's Monkeys on the Interstate, a bear captured in Sanford, Florida, was thought to have been the offspring of an escaped female Asian black bear and a male American black bear, and Scherren's Some notes on hybrid bears published in 1907 mentioned a successful mating between an Asian black bear and a sloth bear. In 1975, within Venezuela's "Las Delicias" Zoo, a female Asian black bear shared its enclosure with a male spectacled bear, and produced several hybrid descendants. In 2005, a possible Asian black bear–sun bear hybrid cub was captured in the Mekong River watershed of eastern Cambodia. An Asian black bear/brown bear hybrid, taken from a bile farm, is housed at the Animals Asia Foundation's China Moon Bear Rescue .

Distribution and habitat
Fossil record indicate that the Asian black bear once ranged as far west as Western Europe, though it now occurs very patchily throughout its former range, which is limited to Asia. Today, it occurs from southeastern Iran eastward through Afghanistan and Pakistan, across the foothills of the Himalayas in India and Myanmar to mainland Southeast Asia, except Malaysia. Its range in northeastern and southern China is patchy, and it is absent in much of east-central China. Other population clusters exist in the southern Russian Far East and in North Korea. A small remnant population survives in South Korea. It also occurs on the Japanese islands of Honshu and Shikoku, as well as on Taiwan and the Chinese island of Hainan.

It typically inhabits deciduous forests, mixed forests and thornbrush forests. In winter, it descends to altitudes below . In Japan, it also occurs at sea level.

There is no definitive estimate as to the number of Asian black bears: Japan posed estimates of 8–14,000 bears living on Honshū, though the reliability of this is now doubted. Although their reliability is unclear, rangewide estimates of 5–6,000 bears have been presented by Russian biologists. In 2012, Japanese Ministry of the Environment estimated the population at 15–20,000. Rough density estimates without corroborating methodology or data have been made in India and Pakistan, resulting in the estimates of 7–9,000 in India and 1,000 in Pakistan. Unsubstantiated estimates from China give varying estimates between 15 and 46,000, with a government estimate of 28,000.

Bangladesh
The Wildlife Trust of Bangladesh conducted an on-field survey of bears in Bangladesh from 2008 to 2010 that included Asian black bears. The survey was done in 87 different places, mostly in the north-central, northeastern and southeastern areas of Bangladesh that had historical presence of bears. The survey result says that most of the areas still has some isolated small bear populations, mainly the Asian black bears. According to the survey, the most evidence found relating to bears were of Asian black bears that included nests, footprints, local sightings, etc. There are many reports on the presence of Asian black bears in the central, north-central, northeastern and southeastern parts of Bangladesh.

Although Asian black bears still occur in different parts of Bangladesh, mainly in the Chittagong Hill Tracts, the population is very small. Conservationists fear that the species will soon be extinct in the country if necessary steps to protect it are not taken in the near future.

China
Three subspecies of the Asian black bear occur in China: the Tibetan subspecies (U. thibetanus thibetanus), the Indochinese subspecies (U. thibetanus mupinensis), and the northeastern subspecies (U. thibetanus ussuricus), which is the only subspecies of bear in northeastern China. Asian black bears are mainly distributed in the conifer forests in the cold and temperate zones of northeast China, the main areas being Chang Bai, Zhang Guangcai, Lao Ye, and the Lesser Xingan Mountains. Within Liaoning province, there are about 100 Asian black bears, which only inhabit the five counties of Xin Bin, Huan Ren, Ben Xi, Kuan Dian, and Fen Cheng. Within Jilin province, Asian black bears occur mainly in the counties of Hunchun, Dun Hua, Wangqing, An Tu, Chang Bai, Fu Song, Jiao He, Hua Dian, Pan Shi, and Shu Lan. In Heilongjiang province, Asian black bears occur in the counties of Ning An, BaYan, Wu Chang, Tong He, Bao Qing, Fu Yuan, Yi Chun, Tao Shan, Lan Xi, Tie Li, Sun Wu, Ai Hui, De Du, Bei An, and Nen Jiang. This population has a northern boundary of about 50° N and the southern boundary in Feng Cheng is about 40°30" N.

Korea
In Korea, most of the Asian black bears live in the broad-leaved forest of the alpine region, more than 1,500 meters north of Jirisan. Korean National Park Service announced on April 15, 2018, that eight mother bears gave birth to 11 babies. Six mother bears living in the wild gave birth to eight babies.  Two mothers that were being taken care by the nature adaptation training center in Gurye, South Jeolla Province gave birth to three babies. Now, there are 56 Asian black bears living in the wild of Jirisan. If the Korea National Park Service releases three cubs born in natural adaptation training centers at September this year, the number of Asian black bears living in the wild will increase to 59. As a result, the restoration of the target of 50 Asian black bears, or the minimum remaining population, will be achieved two years earlier. It was a goal by 2020. Their next goal is to expand and improve the habitat and to increase the genetic diversity of the Asian black bears in Mt. Jiri.

Siberia
In Siberia, the Asian black bear's northern range runs from Innokenti Bay on the coast of the Sea of Japan southwest to the elevated areas of Sikhote Alin crossing it at the sources of the Samarga River. At this point, the boundary directs itself to the north, through the middle course of the Khor, Anyui and Khungari rivers, and comes to the shore of the Amur, crossing it at the level of the mouth of the Gorin River. Along the Amur river, the species' presence has been noted as far as 51° N. Lat. From there, the territorial boundary runs southwest of the river's left bank, passing through the northern part of Lake Bolon and the juncture point of the Kur and Tunguska. Asian black bears are encountered in the Urmi's lower course. Within the Ussuri krai, the species is restricted to broad-leaved Manchurian-type forests.

Taiwan
In Taiwan, the endemic subspecies of Asiatic Black Bear, the Formosan black bear (Ursus thibetanus formosanus), chiefly is confined to the mountain ranges in the central regions of the island. It can be found along the Central and Snow mountain ranges, with populations in the latter being more common. The largest population of bears seem to be Lala mountain in Chatienshan Reserve, the (Snow) Mountain area in Sheipa National Park, and Taroko National Park. These populations' individuals and numbers can be found south to Tawushan Reserve through Yushan National Park. The estimated number of individuals in these regions number some 200 to 600 bears.

Behavior and ecology

Asian black bears are diurnal, though they become nocturnal near human habitations. They may live in family groups consisting of two adults and two successive litters of young. They will walk in a procession of largest to smallest. They are good climbers of rocks and trees, and will climb to feed, rest, sun, elude enemies and hibernate. Some older bears may become too heavy to climb. Half of their life is spent in trees and they are one of the largest arboreal mammals. In the Ussuri territory in the Russian Far East, Asian black bears can spend up to 15% of their time in trees. Asian black bears break branches and twigs to place under themselves when feeding on trees, thus causing many trees in their home ranges to have nest-like structures on their tops. Asian black bears will rest for short periods in nests on trees standing fifteen feet or higher.

Asian black bears do not hibernate over most of their range. They may hibernate in their colder, northern ranges, though some bears will simply move to lower elevations. Nearly all pregnant sows hibernate. Asian black bears prepare their dens for hibernation in mid-October, and will sleep from November until March. Their dens can either be dug-out hollow trees (60 feet above ground), caves or holes in the ground, hollow logs, or steep, mountainous and sunny slopes. They may also den in abandoned brown bear dens. Asian black bears tend to den at lower elevations and on less steep slopes than brown bears. Female Asian black bears emerge from dens later than do males, and female Asian black bears with cubs emerge later than barren females. Asian black bears tend to be less mobile than brown bears.

Asian black bears have a wide range of vocalizations, including grunts, whines, roars, slurping sounds (sometimes made when feeding) and "an appalling row" when wounded, alarmed or angry. They emit loud hisses when issuing warnings or threats, and scream when fighting. When approaching other bears, they produce "tut tut" sounds, thought to be produced by bears snapping their tongue against the roof of their mouth. When courting, they emit clucking sounds.

Reproduction and life cycle

Within Sikhote-Alin, the breeding season of Asian black bears occurs earlier than in brown bears, starting from mid-June to mid-August. Birth also occurs earlier, in mid-January. By late December, the embryos weigh 75 grams. Sows generally have their first litter at the age of three years. Pregnant females generally make up 14% of populations. Similar to brown bears, Asian black bears have delayed implantation. Sows usually give birth in caves or hollow trees in winter or early spring after a gestation period of 200–240 days. Cubs weigh 13 ounces at birth, and will begin walking at four days of age, and open their eyes three days later. The skulls of newborn Asian black bear cubs bear great resemblance to those of adult sun bears. Litters can consist of 1–4 cubs, with 2 being the average. Cubs have a slow growth rate, reaching only 2.5 kg by May. Asian black bear cubs will nurse for 104–130 weeks, and become independent at 24–36 months. There is usually a 2–3 year interval period before females produce subsequent litters. The average lifespan in the wild is 25 years, while the oldest Asian black bear in captivity died at the age of 44.

Feeding

Asian black bears are omnivorous, and will feed on insects, beetle larvae, invertebrates, termites, grubs, carrion, bees, eggs, garbage, mushrooms, grasses, bark, roots, tubers, fruits, nuts, seeds, honey, herbs, acorns, cherries, dogwood, and grain. Although herbivorous to a greater degree than brown bears, and more carnivorous than American black bears, Asian black bears are not as specialized in their diet as giant pandas are: while giant pandas depend on a constant supply of low calorie, yet abundant foodstuffs, Asian black bears are more opportunistic and have opted for a nutritional boom-or-bust economy. They thus gorge themselves on a variety of seasonal high calorie foods, storing the excess calories as fat, and then hibernate during times of scarcity. Asian black bears will eat pine nuts and acorns of the previous year in the April–May period. In times of scarcity, they enter river valleys to gain access to hazelnuts and insect larvae in rotting logs. From mid-May through late June, they will supplement their diet with green vegetation and fruit. Through July to September, they will climb trees to eat bird cherries, pine cones, vines and grapes. On rare occasions they will eat dead fish during the spawning season, though this constitutes a much lesser portion of their diet than in brown bears. In the 1970s, Asian black bears were reported to kill and eat Hanuman langurs in Nepal. They appear to be more carnivorous than most other bears, including American black bears, and will kill ungulates with some regularity, including domestic livestock. Wild ungulate prey can include muntjacs, serow, takin, malayan tapir wild boar and adult water buffaloes, which they kill by breaking their necks.

Interspecific predatory relationships

The Asian black bear's range overlaps with that of the sloth bear in central and southern India, the sun bear in Southeast Asia and the brown bear in the southern part of the Russian Far East.

Asian black bears seem to intimidate Himalayan brown bears in direct encounters. They eat the fruit dropped by Asian black bears from trees, as they themselves are too large and cumbersome to climb.

Asian black bears are occasionally attacked by tigers and brown bears. Leopards are known to prey on bear cubs younger than two years old. Packs of wolves and Eurasian lynxes are potential predators of bear cubs as well.
Asian black bears usually dominate Amur leopards in physical confrontations in heavily vegetated areas, while leopards are uppermost in open areas, though the outcome of such encounters is largely dependent on the size of the individual animals.

Ussuri brown bears may attack Asian black bears.

Tigers occasionally attack and consume Asian black bears. Russian hunters found their remains in tiger scats, and Asian black bear carcasses showing evidence of tiger predation. To escape tigers, Asian black bears rush up a tree and wait for the tiger to leave, though some tigers will pretend to leave, and wait for the bear to descend. Tigers prey foremost on young bears.
Some are very tenacious when attacked: Jim Corbett observed a fight between a tiger and the largest Asian black bear he had ever seen. The bear managed to chase off the tiger, despite having half its nose and scalp torn off. He twice saw Asian black bears carry off tiger kills when the latter was absent.
Asian black bears are usually safe from tiger attacks once they reach five years of age. One fatal attack of a tiger on a juvenile Asian black bear has been recorded in Jigme Dorji National Park.
One Siberian tiger was reported to have lured an Asian black bear by imitating its mating call. However, Asian black bears are probably less vulnerable to tiger attacks than brown bears, due to their habit of living in hollows or in close set rocks.

Legal status
The Asian black bear is listed as a protected animal in China's National Protection Wildlife Law, which stipulates that anyone hunting or catching bears without permits will be subject to severe punishment.

Although the Asian black bear is protected in India, due to being listed as vulnerable in the Red Data Book in Appendix I of CITES in India and in Schedule I of the Indian Wildlife (Protection) Act and its 1991 amendment, it has been difficult to prosecute those accused of poaching Asian black bears due to lack of witnesses and lack of Wildlife Forensic Labs to detect the originality of confiscated animal parts or products. Moreover, due to India's wide-stretching boundaries with other nations such as Pakistan, Tibet, China, Nepal, Bhutan, Bangladesh and Myanmar, it is difficult to police such borders, which are often in mountainous terrain.

Five Asian black bear populations, occurring in Kyushu, Shikoku, West-Chugoku, East-Chugoku and Kii areas, were listed as endangered by the Environmental Agency in the Japanese Red Data Book in 1991. Small isolated populations in the Tanzawa and Shimokita areas of mainland Honshū were listed as endangered in 1995. Beyond recognizing these populations as endangered, there is still a lack of efficient conservation methods for Japanese black bears.

Asian black bears occur as an infrequent species in the Red Data Book of Russia, thus falling under special protection and hunting is prohibited. There is currently a strong movement to legalize the hunting of Russian black bears, which is supported by most of the local scientific community.

As of January 30, 1989, Taiwan's Formosan black bears have been listed as an endangered species under the Natural and Cultural Heritage Act on, and was later listed as a Conserved Species Category I.

The Vietnamese government issued Decision 276/QD, 276/1989, which prohibits the hunting and exporting of Asian black bears. The Red Book of Vietnam lists Vietnamese black bears as endangered.

The Korean Government designated the Asian black bear as Natural Monument No. 329 and it is considered an extinction crisis. At the present time, the Endangered Species Restoration Center of Korea National Park Service is going through species restoration business.

Threats

The main habitat threat to Asian black bears is overcutting of forests, mainly due to human populations increasing to over 430,000 in regions where bears are distributed, in the Shaanxi, Ganshu, and Sichuan provinces. 27 forestry enterprises were built in these areas between 1950 and 1985 (excluding the lumbering units belonging to the county). By the early 1990s, the Asian black bear distribution area was reduced to only one-fifth of the area that existed before the 1940s. Isolated bear populations face environmental and genetic stress in these circumstances. However, one of the most important reasons for their decrease involves overhunting, as Asian black bear paws, gall bladders and cubs have great economic value. Asian black bear harvests are maintained at a high level due to the harm they cause to crops, orchards and bee farms. During the 1950s and 1960s, 1,000 Asian black bears were harvested annually in the Heilongjiang Province. However, purchased furs were reduced by 4/5, even by 9/10 yearly in the late 1970s to the early 1980s. Asian black bears have also been declining annually in Dehong Dai and Jingpo Nations Autonomous Prefecture and the Yunnan Province.

Poaching for gall bladders and skin are the main threats faced by Asian black bears in India.

Although the poaching of Asian black bears is well known throughout Japan, authorities have done little to remedy the situation. The killing of nuisance bears is practiced year-round, and harvest numbers have been on the increase. Box traps have been widely used since 1970 to capture nuisance bears. It is estimated that the number of shot bears will decrease in time, due to the decline of old traditional hunters and the increase of a younger generation less inclined to hunt. Logging is also considered a threat.

Although Asian black bears have been afforded protection in Russia since 1983, illegal poaching, fueled by a growing demand for bear parts in the Asian market, is still a major threat to the Russian population. Many workers of Chinese and Korean origin, supposedly employed in the timber industry, are actually involved in the illegal trade. Some Russian sailors reportedly purchase bear parts from local hunters to sell them to Japanese and Southeast Asian clients. Russia's rapidly growing timber industry has been a serious threat to the Asian black bear's home range for three decades. The cutting of trees containing cavities deprives Asian black bears of their main source of dens, and forces them to den on the ground or in rocks, thus making them more vulnerable to tigers, brown bears and hunters.

In Taiwan, Asian black bears are not actively pursued, though steel traps set out for wild boars have been responsible for unintentional bear trappings. Timber harvesting has largely stopped being a major threat to Taiwan's Asian black bear population, though a new policy concerning the transfer of ownership of hill land from the government to private interests has the potential to affect some lowland habitat, particularly in the eastern part of the nation. The building of new cross island highways through bear habitat is also potentially threatening.

Vietnamese black bear populations have declined rapidly due to the pressures of human population growth and unstable settlement. Hunting pressures have also increased with a coinciding decline of environmental awareness.

South Korea remains one of two countries to allow bear bile farming to continue legally. As reported in 2009, approximately 1,374 Asian black bears reside in an estimated 74 bear farms, where they are kept for slaughter to fuel the demands of traditional Asian medicine. In sharp contrast, fewer than 20 Asian black bears can be found at Jirisan Restoration Center, located in Korea's Jirisan National Park.

Relationships with humans

In folklore and literature
In Japanese culture, the Asian black bear is traditionally associated with the mountain spirit (yama no kami) and is characterized variously as "mountain man", "mountain uncle", "mountain father", a loving mother, and a child. Being a largely solitary creature, the Asian black bear is also viewed as "lonely person" (sabishigariya). Asian black bears feature very little in lowland Japanese folklore, but are prominent in upland Japan, a fact thought to reflect the bear's greater economic value in upland areas.
In Hindu mythology, the Asian black bear Jambavantha (also known as Jambavan or Jamvanta) is believed to have lived from Treta Yuga to Dvapara Yuga. In the epic Ramayana, Jambavantha assists Rama in finding his wife Sita and battle her abductor, Ravana.

Asian black bears are briefly mentioned in Yann Martel's novel The Life of Pi, in which they are described by the protagonist's father as being among the most dangerous animals in his zoo.

Attacks on humans

Although usually shy and cautious animals, Asian black bears are more aggressive towards humans than the brown bears of Eurasia and American black bears. David W. Macdonald theorizes that this greater aggression is an adaptation to being sympatric with tigers. According to Brigadier General R. G. Burton:

In response to a chapter on Asian black bears written by Robert Armitage Sterndale in his Natural History of the Mammalia of India and Ceylon on how Asian black bears were no more dangerous than other animals in India, a reader responded with a letter to The Asian on May 11, 1880:

At the turn of the 20th century, a hospital in Srinagar, Kashmir received dozens of Asian black bear victims annually. When Asian black bears attack humans, they rear up on their hind legs and knock victims over with their paws. Then they bite them on an arm or leg and snap on the victim's head, this being the most dangerous part of the attack.
Asian black bear attacks have been increasing in Kashmir since the Kashmir conflict. In November 2009, in the Kulgam district of Indian-administered Kashmir, an Asian black bear attacked four insurgents after discovering them in its den, and killed two of them.

In India, attacks on humans have been increasing yearly, and have occurred largely in the northwestern and western Himalayan region. In the Chamba District of Himachal Pradesh, the number of Asian black bear attacks on humans has gradually increased from 10 in 1988–89 to 21 in 1991–92. There are no records of predation on humans by Asian black bears in Russia, and no conflicts have been documented in Taiwan. Recent Asian black bear attacks on humans have been reported from Junbesi in Langtang National Park, Nepal, and occurred in villages as well as in the surrounding forest.

Nine people were killed by Asian black bears in Japan between 1979 and 1989. In September 2009, an Asian black bear attacked a group of tourists, mauling nine people and seriously injuring four more at a bus station in the built-up area of Takayama, Gifu.
The majority of attacks tend to occur when Asian black bears are encountered suddenly, and in close quarters. Because of this, Asian black bears are generally considered more dangerous than brown bears, which live in more open spaces and are thus less likely to be surprised by approaching humans. They are also likely to attack when protecting food.

2016 saw several attacks by Asian black bears in Japan. In May and June four people were killed by Asian black bears in Akita prefecture while picking bamboo shoots, and in August a female safari park worker in Gunma prefecture was killed when an Asian black bear climbed into her car and attacked her.

Livestock predation and crop damage
In the past, the farmers of the Himalayan lowlands feared Asian black bears more than any other pest, and would erect platforms in the fields, where watchmen would be posted at night and would beat drums to frighten off any interlopers. However, some Asian black bears would grow accustomed to the sound and encroach anyway.

Of 1,375 livestock kills examined in Bhutan, Asian black bears accounted for 8% of attacks. Livestock predation, overall, was greatest in the summer and autumn periods, which corresponded with a peak in cropping agriculture; livestock are turned out to pasture and forest during the cropping season and, subsequently, are less well-guarded than at other times.

Livestock killed by Asian black bears in Himachal Pradesh, India increased from 29 in 1988–1989 to 45 in 1992–1993.

In the remoter areas of Japan, Asian black bears can be serious crop predators: the bears feed on cultivated bamboo shoots in spring, on plums, watermelons and corn in the summer, and on persimmons, sweet potatoes and rice in the autumn. Japanese black bears are estimated to damage 3,000 bee hives annually. When feeding on large crops such as watermelons or pumpkins, Asian black bears will ignore the flesh and eat the seeds, thus adversely affecting future harvests. Asian black bears can girdle and kill trees by stripping their bark for the sap. This can cause serious economic problems in Asia's valuable timber forests. In the late 1970s, 400–1,200 hectares of land had been affected by Asian black bears bark-stripping Japanese conifers. There is evidence that 70-year-old conifers (commanding the highest market values) may also have been bark-stripped.

Asian black bears will prey on livestock if their natural food is in poor supply. They have been known to attack bullocks, either killing them outright, or eating them alive.

Tameability and trainability
Along with sun bears, Asian black bears are the most typically used species in areas where bears are used either in performances or as pets. Asian black bears have an outstanding learning ability in captivity, and are among the most common species used in circus acts. According to Gary Brown:

Asian black bears are easily tamed, and can be fed with rice, maize, sweet potatoes, cassavas, pumpkins, ripe fruit, animal fat and sweet foods. Keeping captive Asian black bears is popular in China, especially due to the belief that milking the bear's gall bladder leads to quick prosperity. Asian black bears are also popular as pets in Vietnam.

Hunting and exploitation

Hunting

According to The Great and Small Game of India, Burma, and Tibet, regarding the hunting of Asian black bears in British India:

The book also describes a second method of black bear hunting involving the beating of small patches of forest, when the bears march out in single file. However, black bears were rarely hunted for sport, because of the poor quality of their fur and the ease by which they could be shot in trees, or stalked, as their hearing was poor.

Although easy to track and shoot, Asian black bears were known by British sportsmen to be extremely dangerous when injured. Brigadier General R.G. Burton wrote of how many sportsmen had been killed by Asian black bears after failing to make direct hits.

Today, Asian black bears are only legally hunted for sport in Japan and Russia. In Russia, 75–100 Asian black bears are legally harvested annually, though 500 a year are reportedly harvested illegally.

After the introduction of Buddhism in Japan, which prohibited the killing of animals, the Japanese compromised by devising different strategies in hunting bears. Some, such as the inhabitants of the Kiso area in the Nagano Prefecture, prohibited the practice altogether, while others developed rituals in order to placate the spirits of killed bears. In some Japanese hunting communities, Asian black bears lacking the white chest mark are considered sacred. Similar beliefs were held in Nagano, where the completely black Asian black bears were termed  or cat-bear.  communities believed that killing an Asian black bear in the mountains would result in a bad storm, which was linked to the belief that bear spirits could affect weather. The  would generally hunt Asian black bears in spring or from late autumn to early winter, before they hibernated. In mountain regions, Asian black bears were hunted by driving them upland to a waiting hunter, who would then shoot it. Bear hunting expeditions were preceded by rituals, and could last up to two weeks. After killing the bear, the  would pray for the bear's soul. Asian black bear hunts in Japan are often termed , meaning "bear conquest". The word  itself is often used in Japanese folklore to describe the slaying of monsters and demons.

Traditionally, the Atayal, Taroko, and Bunun people of Taiwan consider Asian black bears to be almost human in their behaviors, and thus unjust killing of bears is equated with murder and will cause misfortunes such as disease, death, or crop failure. The Bunun people call Asian black bears Aguman or Duman, which means devil. Traditionally, a Bunun hunter who has accidentally trapped an Asian black bear has to build a cottage in the mountains and cremate the bear within it. The hunter must stay in the cottage alone, away from the village until the end of the millet harvest, as it is believed that the killing of an Asian black bear will cause the millet crop to burn black. In the Tungpu area, Asian black bears are considered animals of the "third category": animals with the most remote relationship to humans and whose activity is restricted outside human settlements. Therefore, when Asian black bears encroach upon human settlements, they are considered ill omens. In this situation, the community can either destroy the trespassing bears or settle somewhere else. The Rukai and Paiwan people are permitted to hunt Asian black bears, though they believe that doing so will curse the hunters involved: Rukai people believe that hunting Asian black bears can result in disease. Children are forbidden from eating bear meat, which is itself not permitted to be taken within homes.

Products
Accounts on the quality of the Asian black bear's fur vary. According to Natural History of the Mammalia of India and Ceylon, "Their skins are always poor and mangy, and generally so greasy that they are very difficult to keep until you can make them over to the dresser", which is corroborated by The Great and Small Game of India, Burma, and Tibet, which states "... the skins are never of any particular value, and in autumn, owing to the masses of yellow fat that are accumulated beneath them, are absolutely useless." In British India, grease was the only practical use for Asian black bear carcasses. Bears living near villages were considered the most ideal, as they were almost invariably fatter than their forest-dwelling counterparts. In the former USSR, the Asian black bear yielded fur, meat and fat of greater quality than those of the brown bear.

Asian black bears have been hunted for their parts in China since the Stone Age. Bile is most appreciated, as it supposedly cures many diseases, effectively treats the accumulation of blood below the skin, and counters toxic effects. Also, bear bone glue is used as a tonic, and bear fat is also used as a traditional medicine and a tonic. Asian black bear meat is also edible. Due to their many uses, Asian black bears are worth about 20–30 million dong (US$1,500–2,250) each in Vietnam.

References

External links

 Asiatic Black Bears
 Animal Diversity Web: Ursus thibetanus
 Bearplanet.org: Asiatic Black Bear
 Asiatic Black Bear Conservation Action Plan

Asiatic black bears
Fauna of South Asia
Fauna of Southeast Asia
Mammals of East Asia
Carnivorans of Malaysia
Bear, Asian Black
Fauna of Siberia
Mammals described in 1823
Taxa named by Georges Cuvier